Iuliu Borbely I (born 1909) was a Romanian football midfielder. His brother Alexandru Borbely was also a national team footballer, they played together at Juventus București, Belvedere București and ASCAM București.

International career
Iuliu Borbely played three friendly games for Romania, making his debut in a 3–2 away victory against Bulgaria.

Notes

References

External links
Iuliu Borbely at Labtof.ro

1909 births
Romanian footballers
Romania international footballers
Association football midfielders
Liga I players
Liga II players
FC Petrolul Ploiești players
CA Oradea players
Sportspeople from Satu Mare
Year of death missing